Mudawad is a small village in Shindkheda tehsil of Dhule district in Maharashtra, India. It is situated on the confluence of the Tapti and Panzara rivers. The temple of Kapileshwar on the confluence was constructed in the 17th century by Ahilyabai Holkar of Indore.

Gallery

References 

Villages in Dhule district